Sergei Vladimirovich Grishin (born 22 December 1951) is a former professional football functionary from Russia and a former Soviet player. Currently he works as an administrator for FC Lokomotiv Moscow.

His son Sergei played for the Russia national football team.

Honours
Soviet Top League champion: 1976 (autumn)
Soviet Top League bronze: 1977

References

External links
Career summary by KLISF

1951 births
Living people
Russian footballers
Soviet footballers
FC Torpedo Moscow players
FC SKA-Khabarovsk players
FC Arsenal Tula players
Soviet Top League players
Association football forwards
FC Volga Nizhny Novgorod players